The second seed, René Lacoste, defeated Jean Borotra 6–3, 2–6, 6–0, 2–6, 8–6 in the final to win the men's singles tennis title at the 1929 French Championships.

Seeds
The seeded players are listed below. René Lacoste is the champion; others show the round in which they were eliminated.

  Henri Cochet (semifinals)
  René Lacoste (champion)
  Bill Tilden (semifinals)
  Jean Borotra (finalist)
  Frank Hunter (quarterfinals)
  Umberto L. De Morpurgo (quarterfinals)
  Bunny Austin (third round)
  J. Colin Gregory (fourth round)
  Jacques Brugnon (quarterfinals)
  Béla Von Kehrling (quarterfinals)
  Louis Raymond (first round)
  Giorgio de Stefani (first round)
  Christian Boussus (fourth round)
  René De Buzelet (second round)
  Daniel Prenn (third round)
  Hans Moldenhauer (fourth round)

Draw

Key
 Q = Qualifier
 WC = Wild card
 LL = Lucky loser
 r = Retired

Final eight

Earlier rounds

Section 1

Section 2

Section 3

Section 4

Section 5

Section 6

Section 7

Section 8

References

External links
 

French Championships - Men's Singles
French Championships (tennis) by year – Men's singles